"This Whole World" is a song by American rock band the Beach Boys from their 1970 album Sunflower. Written by Brian Wilson, the song features his brother Carl on lead vocals and is credited as a Beach Boys production.  Earlier in the year, it had been included on the Warner Brothers promotional sampler album The Big Ball, and as a single, fronted with "Slip On Through", but did not make the U.S. or UK pop charts.

Background
Brian recalled writing "This Whole World" during one night at his Beverly Hills mansion when he was "stoned and confused". He stated that the song was written in approximately 90 minutes at around 2:00 a.m. "I got up and went to my white Baldwin organ and I was playing around and thinking about the love of this whole world and that’s what inspired me to write the song." 

He also said of the song: "A very special vocal by Carl, and the lyrics are very spiritual. The melody and chord pattern rambles but it comes back to where it started." Regarding the lyrics, he said, "It’s about love in general. ... That song came from deep down in me, from the feeling I had that the whole world should be about love. When I wrote that song I wanted to capture that idea.'"

Composition
Biographer Mark Dillon characterized "This Whole World" as an "old-fashioned" rock song with "doo-wop trimmings" that contains an unorthodox structure and numerous key modulations. Musician Scott McCaughey said that the structure followed an A/B/C/A/B/C pattern, however, "it seems to never repeat itself once. Every section has something new and different going on." Musicologist Philip Lambert offered a summary of the song's exceptional "tonal transience":

In 1978, Beach Boys supporting keyboardist Daryl Dragon commented on the song's various key changes: "From a harmony standpoint, I've never heard a song like that since I've been in pop music. I've never heard a song go through that many changes and come back."

Recording
The track was recorded in one session on November 13, 1969 at Beach Boys Studio. According to Brian: "I produced that record. I taught Carl the lead and the other guys the background vocal, especially the meditation part at the end: 'Om dot dit it.'" The track originally ran "far longer" but was trimmed down. Brian later commented, "I remember 'This Whole World' took a couple of days to record. It took a lot of hard work to get that one but I’m real happy with it." Another version with an alternate ending was created for an Eastern Airlines commercial that the group briefly appeared in.

Critical reception
AllMusic wrote: "Brian reestablished his reputation as one of the most brilliant melody writers and arrangers. With a buoyant melody and an effervescent, classy vocal arrangement, Brian wipes away three years of artistic cobwebs."

Cover versions

 A version of this song which incorporated "Star Light, Star Bright" in the bridge was produced by Wilson for the pop duo American Spring in 1971
 Brian Wilson re-recorded the song for his 1995 soundtrack album I Just Wasn't Made for These Times
 Dolour covered this on 2002's Brian tribute compilation, Making God Smile: An Artists' Tribute to the Songs of Beach Boy Brian Wilson

Personnel
Sourced from Craig Slowinski.
The Beach Boys
 Brian Wilson – intro lead vocals, backing vocals, piano, production
 Mike Love – intro lead vocals, backing vocals
 Al Jardine – backing vocals
 Carl Wilson – lead vocals, acoustic guitar, production
 Dennis Wilson – backing vocals
 Bruce Johnston – backing vocals
Additional musicians and production staff
 Jerry Cole – rhythm/lead guitar
 David Cohen – lead guitar
 Jack Conrad – bass
 Ray Pohlman – six-string bass
 Daryl Dragon – electric harpsichord, chimes, tubular bells
 Dennis Dragon – drums
 Gene Estes – chimes, glockenspiel
 Stephen Desper – engineer

References

Sources

External links
 
 
 
 
 

1970 songs
The Beach Boys songs
Songs written by Brian Wilson
Brian Wilson songs
Song recordings produced by the Beach Boys
1970 singles